Cloughton railway station was a railway station on the Scarborough & Whitby Railway. It opened on 16 July 1885, and served the North Yorkshire village of Cloughton, and to a lesser extent the village of Burniston.

The station had a canopied goods shed, and the '1904 Handbook of Stations', listed it as being able to handle general goods, livestock, horse boxes and prize cattle vans. it also had a 1-ton 10 cwt permanent crane.

The station was host to a LNER camping coach in 1935, possibly one for some of 1934 and three coaches from 1936 to 1939. Two coaches were positioned here by North Eastern Region of British Railways from 1954 and three from 1959 to 1964.

The station closed on 8 March 1965.

The station has been restored and is currently used as a private house, with guest accommodation provided in a converted railway carriage, a converted goods shed, and two B&B suites. A tea room formerly operated in the station building, but that closed in September 2019.

References

Further reading

External links
Cloughton Station website

Disused railway stations in the Borough of Scarborough
Former North Eastern Railway (UK) stations
Beeching closures in England
Railway stations in Great Britain opened in 1885
Railway stations in Great Britain closed in 1965